Whitnash is a town and civil parish located southeast of, and contiguous with Leamington Spa and Warwick in Warwickshire, England. In 2001, it had a population of 7,760 which increased to 9,129 in the 2011 census, increasing again to 10,489 in the 2021 census.

History
Whitnash was mentioned in the Domesday Book as Witenas, by 1326 it had become Whitenasshe meaning 'white ash'. As Whitnash is generally thought to derive from the Anglo-Saxon ‘at the white ash’ other derivations have included ‘place by the wood’, ‘sacred ash’ or the 'meeting place of the wise'. Whitnash has likely been settled since Celtic times. According to tradition, just east of the town there was a Celtic fortification in a field known as “Castle Hill Field”. The parish church of St Margaret's is of Anglo-Saxon origin, and stands on a mound which may have been a pre-Christian pagan site, it was largely rebuilt between 1855 and 1880 to designs by Sir George Gilbert Scott.

Whitnash at one time had a holy well, located around 400 metres east of the town. According to a local legend, a church bell was dropped accidentally into the well when it was being taken there to be consecrated, according to the legend, the bell then gained the ability to foretell the future; at night time people would drop a stone into the well and ask a question. Then at daybreak it would give its answer: one ring for yes and two for no. The bell is commemorated in Whitnash's municipal crest.

Whitnash was for most of its history a small village, the population in 1931 was 586. Around the historic core of the old village are a number of older half timbered buildings dating from the 17th century, including the Plough and Harrow inn. Until modern times, Whitnash was a fairly isolated community, which has led to it retaining a strong sense of local identity. 

Dramatic population growth began during the second half of the 20th century. Reflecting its much larger size, in 1978 Whitnash became a town through the resolution of its parish council; thenceforth the parish council became a town council.

Town centre

Whitnash does not have a well defined town centre as such; with Leamington Spa town centre only 2 miles to the north, a central district for Whitnash never developed, and the town expanded residentially only, around the small historic core around St. Margaret's Church. Whitnash has three neighbourhood shopping areas around Coppice Road, Heathcote Road /Acre Close and Home Farm Crescent. Other facilities include a community hall, a library and an information centre. In November 2021, the Town Council completed development of its new Civic Centre and Library, which has the Town Council office, library, conference room and sports hall suitable for badminton and other recreational activities.

Education
There are four primary schools in the town. Whitnash Primary, St Joseph's RC Primary, St Margaret's Middle School and Briar Hill First School. There are no secondary schools located in Whitnash, but the state schools Campion School, Myton School and Trinity Catholic School name Whitnash as being within their priority areas.

Politics
The Whitnash Resident's Association dominates the local political scene, holding all the town's seats on Warwick District Council. Founded as the Whitnash Ratepayer's Association in 1977, the residents' association has also held the town's seat on Warwickshire County Council for many years. It also holds all seats on the Town Council.

Recreation
At the Whitnash Sports & Social Club, there is a petanque club (http://www.whitnashpetanque.co.uk/) and Lawn Bowls club. Whitnash Sports and Social club is the new home of the Leamington Royals rugby league team, who represent Royal Leamington Spa, Warwick and the surrounding areas in the Midlands RL Conference. Whitnash Town FC is the local association football club. The Leamington and County golf club is also within the parish.

Local media
Whitnash has a free quarterly news pamphlet called the ‘Whitnash Tymes’ posted to every residence in the town. Usually entailing messages from the mayor and local authorities, listings, local business advertisements, local news, and events.

Demographics
The 2021 census recorded that 78.2% of Whitnash residents were White, 15.5% were Asian, 0.9% were Black, 2.8% were Mixed, with 2.5% belonging to any other ethnic group. In terms of religion 46.1% were Christian, 36.6% had no religion, 12% were Sikh, 3.2% were Hindu, and 1.5% Muslim.

Twin towns
  Weilerswist, Germany
  Villebon-sur-Yvette, France

References

External links

Whitnash Town Council
Whitnash archives - Our Warwickshire

 
Towns in Warwickshire